Alex Wilson (born 21 March 1994) is an Australian professional basketball player.

Career

WNBL
After gaining national attention as a 16-year-old, Wilson signed as a development player with the Adelaide Lightning for the 2010–11 season, where she would make her WNBL debut. From Adelaide, Wilson would go onto train with the Australian Institute of Sport. In 2014, Wilson was named the WNBL Rookie of the Year whilst playing with the Townsville Fire.

In May 2015, after two seasons and a championship in Townsville, Wilson would sign with the Sydney Uni Flames for the 2015–16 season. In her time with Sydney, Wilson would go on to win a second WNBL Championship in 2017.

In October 2020, after five years in Sydney, Wilson signed with the Adelaide Lightning for the 2020 season.

National Team

Youth Level
Wilson was a well known player and outstanding junior representative from South Australia. Wilson, playing in the guard position, was a key player in the Australian Gems team that claimed bronze at the 2013 FIBA U19 World Championships, averaging 13 points and 7 rebounds per game.  She also represented Australia in the FIBA Under 17 World Championships in 2010 and was named Australian Under 20 Championship Most Valuable Player in 2013.

References

1994 births
Living people
Adelaide Lightning players
Australian women's basketball players
Guards (basketball)
Sydney Uni Flames players
Townsville Fire players
Universiade medalists in basketball
Universiade gold medalists for Australia
Medalists at the 2017 Summer Universiade
20th-century Australian women
21st-century Australian women
Commonwealth Games bronze medallists for Australia